Mylon is a genus of skippers in the family Hesperiidae.

Species
Mylon lassia (Hewitson, 1868)
Mylon illineatus Mabille & Boullet, 1917
Mylon orsa Evans, 1953
Mylon mestor Evans, 1953
Mylon ander Evans, 1953
Mylon maimon (Fabricius, 1775)
Mylon cajus (Plötz, 1884)
Mylon salvia Evans, 1953
Mylon zephus (Butler, 1870)

References
Natural History Museum Lepidoptera genus database
Mylon at funet

Erynnini
Hesperiidae of South America
Hesperiidae genera
Taxa named by Frederick DuCane Godman
Taxa named by Osbert Salvin